Kevin Andrew Harbottle Carrasco (born 8 June 1990) is a Chilean footballer who currently plays for C.D. Arturo Fernández Vial in the Primera B de Chile.

Club career

Harbottle was raised in Iquique, with his mother and stepfather. It is in this city where he started playing futsal. Was later discovered by a football teacher who took him to play for Racing of Taltal, where he had early success. At 14, he reached the lower divisions of Deportes Antofagasta and from the under 15 squad moved up in the youth system.

Harbottle made his professional debut on 6 June 2008, wearing the shirt of Deportes Antofagasta, a club which trained him as a player. In this match, Antofagasta defeated Rangers by a 2-1 score. His first goal as a professional was against Cobreloa, after only 21 days of his debut. Later, and with few only having played a few matches, he dazzled the leaders of Argentinos Juniors, who purchased his pass from Antofagasta and he was tested on the reserve team. In Argentina he remained only one semester before joining O'Higgins on loan, who was managed at that time by Jorge Sampaoli, where he did not have much continuity.

With the arrival of Roberto Hernandez as new manager of the "celestes", Harbottle scored six goals in the Chilean Apertura 2010. In June 2010, he prompted the interest of directors from Unión Española, who signed him on loan for one year. However, despite the fact he scored in crucial matches (he scored the only goal for Unión Española in a Copa Libertadores match against Universidad Católica), he wasn't a first option at attacking midfielder for manager José Luis Sierra, reason for which the colony club didn't opt for purchasing his contract.

In June 2011, he signed for Universidad Católica for a year and a half deal. During his time with Católica Harbottle helped the club in capturing the 2011 Copa Chile.

On 17 January 2013, he signed with the Colorado Rapids of Major League Soccer. Harbottle was released on 31 July after playing fewer than 300 minutes.

National team

In 2008, Harbottle was selected for the first time for the Chilean under-20 team, managed by Ivo Basay, where he scored a goal against Bolivia U20. Nevertheless, Basay decided not to include him in the final roster for the South American U-20 Championship in 2009. Later, in 2010 he was selected again for the U-22 team, now managed by César Vacchia to participate in the 2010 Toulon Tournament.

In the same year, he made his debut for Chile's senior team managed by Marcelo Bielsa in a friendly against Trinidad and Tobago before the FIFA World Cup 2010.

Career statistics

Honours

Club
Universidad Católica
Copa Chile: 2011

References

External links
 
 Profile at Union Española

1990 births
Living people
People from Antofagasta
Chilean people of English descent
Chilean footballers
Chilean expatriate footballers
Chile under-20 international footballers
Chile international footballers
C.D. Antofagasta footballers
Argentinos Juniors footballers
O'Higgins F.C. footballers
Unión Española footballers
Club Deportivo Universidad Católica footballers
Colorado Rapids players
Colorado Rapids 2 players
Unión San Felipe footballers
San Marcos de Arica footballers
Deportes Temuco footballers
Tampico Madero F.C. footballers
C.D. Arturo Fernández Vial footballers
Chilean Primera División players
Argentine Primera División players
Major League Soccer players
USL Championship players
Ascenso MX players
Segunda División Profesional de Chile players
Primera B de Chile players
Association football forwards
Expatriate footballers in Argentina
Expatriate soccer players in the United States
Expatriate footballers in Mexico
Chilean expatriate sportspeople in Argentina
Chilean expatriate sportspeople in the United States
Chilean expatriate sportspeople in Mexico